Pyruvate phosphate dikinase regulatory protein may refer to:
 (Pyruvate, phosphate dikinase)-phosphate phosphotransferase, an enzyme
 (Pyruvate, phosphate dikinase) kinase, an enzyme